ICCA may refer to:

Organizations
 Indigenous and Community Conserved Area, areas in which there are close associations between indigenous people or a local community and a specific territory or natural resources
 International Congress and Convention Association,  organization in the meetings industry
 International Correspondence Chess Association, now the International Correspondence Chess Federation
 International Council of Chemical Associations
 Inter-parliamentary Coalition for Combating Antisemitism, an international coalition

Other Uses
 International Championship of Collegiate A Cappella, an international competition for student-run and -directed a cappella singing groups
 ICGA Journal, formerly ICCA Journal